Jorge Arteaga may refer to:

 Jorge Arteaga (racing driver) (born 1986), Mexican racing driver and entrepreneur
 Jorge Arteaga (footballer, born 1966), Peruvian football defender
 Jorge Arteaga (footballer, born 1998), Peruvian football goalkeeper